Pterolophia andrewesi is a species of beetle in the family Cerambycidae. It was discovered and described for the first time by Stephan von Breuning in 1938.

References

andrewesi
Beetles described in 1938